Contoderopsis is a genus of beetles in the family Cerambycidae, containing the following species:

 Contoderopsis aurivillii Breuning, 1956
 Contoderopsis luzonica Breuning, 1970

References

Acanthocinini
Taxa named by Stephan von Breuning (entomologist)